Esteves is a Portuguese family name. Esteves comes from esteva, a flower in Portuguese. It is a patronymic, meaning son of Stephen. It is equivalent to the Galician name Estévez/Esteves, which takes the form Estevez in America.

Notable people with the name include:

 Luis R. Esteves (1893–1958), founder of the Puerto Rico National Guard
 Adriana Esteves (born 1969), Brazilian actress
 Horacio Esteves (1940–1996), Venezuelan sprinter
 Ricardo Esteves (born 1979), Portuguese footballer
 Décio Esteves (1927–2000), Brazilian football player and coach
 Alfredo Esteves (born 1976), Portuguese-East Timorese footballer
 Jose Esteves (born 1947), mayor of Milpitas, California
 Imara Esteves Ribalta (born 1978), Cuban beach volleyball player
 Miguel Esteves Cardoso (born 1955), Portuguese writer, translator, critic and journalist
 Hélder Esteves (born 1977), Portuguese football striker
 Adérito Esteves (born 1985), Portuguese rugby union player
 Leonardo Esteves de Nápoles (c. 1350–1421), Portuguese nobleman and military
 Sandra María Esteves, American poet and graphic artist
 José de Jesús Esteves (1881-1918), Puerto Rican poet, lawyer, and judge
 Rui Esteves (born 1967), Portuguese football midfielder
 Sérgio Esteves (born 1968), Portuguese swimmer
 Constantino Esteves (1914–1985), Portuguese film director
 Tomás Esteves (born 2002), Portuguese footballer

See also

Estevez

Portuguese-language surnames
Patronymic surnames
Surnames from given names